Arnaud Desjardins (June 18, 1925 in Paris – August 10, 2011 in Grenoble) was a French author. He was a producer at the Office de Radiodiffusion Télévision Française from 1952 to 1974, and was one of the first high-profile practitioners of Eastern religion in France. He worked on television documentaries about spiritual traditions not well known to many Europeans at the time, including Hinduism, Tibetan Buddhism, Zen, and Sufism from Afghanistan.

Life and work
Arnaud Desjardins was the son of Jacques Guérin-Desjardins. He was part of the George Gurdjieff group, his first contact with mysticism. Educated in a Protestant Christian environment, he was exposed to spiritual aspects of Christianity on a visit to a trappist Catholic monastery. He then became interested in yoga, and when asked to direct a film for French television, he chose to make a series of films on India, for which he gained attention for his first film, Ashrams.

He met a spiritual teacher, Swami Prajnanpad, whom he got to know after filming a number of mystics from various traditions. He became a practitioner of Adhyatma yoga, which is a branch of Advaita Vedanta.

Works

Filmography 

Hinduism:

 Ashrams, 1959

Tibetan Buddhism: 
 Le Message des Tibétains: Le Bouddhisme (première partie), 1966 
 The Message of the Tibetans: First Part, Buddhism (VHS), Alize Diffusion (1994)
 Le Message des Tibétains: Le Tantrisme (deuxième partie), 1966 
 The Message of the Tibetans: Second Part, Tantrism (VHS), Alize Diffusion (1994)
In this two-part documentary, Arnaud Desjardins documents the practices and rites of Tibetans, and meets the Dalai Lama and spiritual teachers of Tibetan Buddhism and Tantra. 
 Himalaya, Terre de Sérénité: Le Lac des Yogis (première partie), 1968
 Himalaya, Terre de Sérénité: Les Enfants de la Sagesse (deuxième partie), 1968

Zen Buddhism:

 Zen: Ici et Maintenant (première partie), 1971
 Zen: Partout et Toujours (deuxième partie), 1971

Soufism:

 Soufis D'Afghanistan: Maître et Disciple (première partie), 1974
 Soufis D'Afghanistan: Au Cœur des Confréries (deuxième partie), 1974

Bibliography 

 Ashrams, Grands Maîtres de l'Inde, Paris, La Palatine, 1962
 Yoga et Spiritualité, L'Hindouisme et Nous, Paris, La Palatine, 1964
 Le Message des Tibétains, Paris, La Table ronde, 1966 (The message of the Tibetans, Stuart & Watkins, 1969)
 Les Chemins de la Sagesse (Tomes I,II,III), Paris, La Table ronde, 1968, 1970 and 1972
 Monde Moderne et Sagesse Ancienne, Paris, La Table ronde, 1973 
 Adhyatma Yoga, À la Recherche du Soi I, Paris, La Table ronde, 1977
 Le Védanta et l'Inconscient, À la Recherche du Soi II, Paris, La Table ronde, 1979
 Au-Delà du moi, À la Recherche du Soi III, Paris, La Table ronde, 1979
 Tu Es Cela, À la Recherche du Soi IV, Paris, La Table ronde, 1979
 Un Grain de Sagesse, Paris, La Table ronde, 1983
 Pour une Mort sans Peur, Paris, La Table ronde, 1983
 Rencontre avec Arnaud & Denise Desjardins, Actes du colloque Institut Karma-Ling 16, 17, 18 July 1984, Prajna
 Pour une Vie Réussie, un Amour Réussi, Paris, La Table ronde, 1985 / Towards the Fullness of Life, Threshold Books, 1989, Kathleen Kennedy (Translator) 
 Filigrane Vol. 1 - Entretiens avec Arnaud Desjardins et Christian Charrière, Argel, 1986
 La Voie du Cœur, Paris, La Table ronde, 1987 
 L'Audace de Vivre, Paris, La Table ronde, 1989 / The Jump Into Life: Moving Beyond Fear, Hohm Press, 1994, Kathleen Kennedy (Translator) 
 Approaches de la Méditation, Paris, La Table ronde, 1989
 La Voie et ses Pièges, Paris, La Table ronde, 1992
 Confidences Impersonnelles (Entretiens avec Gilles Farcet), Paris, Critérion, 1991 
 Zen et Védanta, Paris, La Table Ronde, 1995
 Dialogue à Deux Voies (avec Lama Denis Teundroup), Paris, La Table ronde, 1995
 L'Ami Spirituel (avec Véronique Loiseleur), Paris, La Table ronde, 1996
 Regards Sages sur un Monde Fou (Entretiens avec Gilles Farcet), Paris, La Table ronde, 1997
 Arnaud Desjardins - Textes recueillis par Marc de Smedt, Question de N°111, Albin Michel, 1998
 En Relisant les Évangiles (avec Véronique Loiseleur), Paris, La Table ronde, 1999
 La conversion intime, Alice, 2000
 Arnaud Desjardins au Québec, Montréal, Stanke, 2002
 Retour à l'Essentiel, Paris, La Table ronde, 2002
 La transmission spirituelle – Textes recueillis par Yvan Amar, Du Relié, 2003
 Bienvenue sur la Voie, Paris, La Table ronde, 2004
 Premiers pas vers la Sagesse, Collection Librio-Spiritualité N°661, Librio, 2004
 Lettre à une jeune disciple, Paris, La Table ronde, 2006

See also 

 Adhyatma yoga

Sources
 Arnaud Desjardins, ou l'Aventure de la Sagesse, Gilles Farcet, Paris, La Table Ronde, 1990
 Arnaud Desjardins, l'Ami Spirituel, Jacques Mousseau, Paris, Perrin, 2002

External links
Official site
 A DVD series on the teachings of Arnaud Desjardins in English, from the Festival of Newness retreat led in the US, 2007
Films of Arnaud Desjardins
To find out more about him and his spiritual masters
Resources, texts, and quotes about Arnaud Desjardins
Video extracts and texts of Arnaud Desjardins

1925 births
Tibetan Buddhist art and culture
French film directors
French Hindus
2011 deaths